Penguin Island is a small island, with an area of 2.73 ha, part of the North Coast Group, lying in the southern Bass Strait near Devonport in north-west Tasmania.  It is part of the Narawntapu National Park.  An estimated 100 pairs of little penguins breed on the island.

References

See also
 Penguin Islet (Tasmania)

 Islands of North West Tasmania
 Protected areas of Tasmania